The Boilermakers and Blacksmiths Society of Australia (BBS) was an Australian trade union representing boilermakers and blacksmiths between 1965 and 1972.

It was established on 1 January 1966 with the amalgamation of the Boilermakers' Society of Australia and the Blacksmiths' Society of Australia. Though widely described as the formation of a new union, it inherited the industrial registration of the Boilermakers' Society. The union was associated with a "militant left-wing" group within the Metal Trades Federation.

The BBS was the principal union involved in the 1971 Harco work-in, in which rank-and-file workers seized control of a heavy engineering factory in the Sydney suburb of Campbelltown to protest the sacking of five boilermakers. The workers, inspired by the example of 'work-ins' at Upper Clyde Shipbuilders in the UK and French car workers during the May 68 of 1968, occupied the factory for a period of four weeks.

It amalgamated with the Sheet Metal Working Industrial Union of Australia and the Amalgamated Engineering Union in 1972 and ceased to exist at that time; however, due to legal issues over the name of the new union, the successor Amalgamated Metal Workers Union was not registered until 1973.

References

Defunct trade unions of Australia
Metal trade unions
1966 establishments in Australia
Trade unions established in 1966
Trade unions disestablished in 1972
1972 disestablishments in Australia